ARCOS LLC is a software company based in Columbus, Ohio that provides an automated crew callout and resource management software system for finding, assembling and tracking repair crews for electric and gas utility companies. ARCOS LLC is often referred to simply as ARCOS (a registered trademark of ARCOS LLC in the United States since Aug. 6, 2013). ARCOS is a supplier to American utility companies.  The ARCOS System is a software-as-a-service subscription. The ARCOS System is also used by power generation plants to maintain plant efficiency.

Callout
Callout is defined as an order to report for emergency or special work at an unusual time or place. Many utilities rely on customers to report a power outage or gas leak by phone or email. Once notified, utility supervisors or dispatchers then call to find available workers and assemble a crew. Utilities direct a crew to the affected area to track the cause of a disruption in power or gas leak and restore service. The order in which each lineman is called out for work after business hours is often stipulated by workplace rules and union agreements. Electric utility companies as well as gas and nuclear utilities use automated callout systems to reduce the time it takes to assemble a crew for power restoration work. By using an automated callout system instead of a manual process in which dispatchers dial workers’ phone numbers and ask for help, utilities reduces the time to fill a callout. Assembling and dispatching crews faster can reduce storm CAIDI (customer average interruption duration index) by up to 30 minutes because crews get to the scene of trouble faster.

History
ARCOS, an acronym for Automated Roster Call Out System, evolved from a company launched by Mitchell McLeod in 1993 called McLeod & Associates, which designed software for Fortune 1000 companies. In 1997, Alliant Energy Corp. asked McLeod to streamline the utility company’s callout system, which McLeod accomplished. Other U.S. utility companies asked for the same automated callout system, and McLeod focused his business on developing automated callout systems. McLeod spun off this business line in 2005, creating ARCOS. Originally, the software assumed that all utility crews were available, but that wasn't always true. So ARCOS had its scheduling software sync with work management programs. As a human capital management system, it also now keeps track as a status changes.

On November 11, 2013, Corum Group announced that ARCOS obtained a strategic investment from the Riverside Company to allow it to expand operations and staff. At the time of The Riverside Company's investment, ARCOS, Inc. changed its name to ARCOS LLC.

Noteworthy 
Each year from 2007 to 2014, ARCOS has won Columbus Business First’s Fast 50 Award, an annual ranking of the 50 fastest-growing emerging companies in Central Ohio. Fast 50 Awardees are privately held and have at least $1 million in revenue per year with a three-year operating history. Each year, the award recognizes companies for financial growth and performance over the past three years.

In 2011, Salt River Project, the third-largest U.S. public power utility, became the first company to put in place a smartphone automated callout application made by ARCOS. With the ARCOS mobile app, supervisors at SRP use smartphones, instead of laptop computers, to launch after-hours callouts for electricity repair crews.

American Electric Power Company Inc. has used the software to quicken its response rates.

See also
 Callout
 Electric utility
 Electricity generation
 Power generation

References

External links
 arcos-inc.com
 Transmission & Distribution World reports on Dominion Virginia Power’s use of automated callout

Software companies based in Ohio
Companies established in 1993
Software companies of the United States